Ahmed Mohammed Ahmed Saad Al Amer (born ) is a Bahraini politician, banker, and trade unionist. He was sworn into the Council of Representatives on December 12, 2018, representing the First District in the Southern Governorate.

Biography
Al Amer earned a master’s degree in management with a major in marketing. He worked as a senior manager at Ithmaar Bank and has been on the board of the Bahrain Bankers Syndicate. Additionally, he belongs to the General Federation of Workers Trade Unions in Bahrain.

In the 2014 Bahraini general election, he ran for the First District in the Southern Governorate. With 984 votes for 18.15% in the first round, he did not make the runoff.

In the 2018 Bahraini general election, he ran again for the same constituency, this time winning 1,602 votes for 28.46% in the first round on November 24, necessitating a second round on December 2. In this round, Al Amer defeated his opponent Nasreen Maarouf by winning 2,871 votes for 56.92%.

References

Members of the Council of Representatives (Bahrain)
Bahraini military personnel
Bahraini Sunni Muslims
1977 births
Living people